The Cebuano Wikipedia is the Cebuano-language edition of Wikipedia, the free online encyclopedia. It currently contains  articles, most of which were created by the automated program Lsjbot. There are  active users.

Importance in the language area
It is the largest Philippine-language Wikipedia by number of articles, ahead of Waray Wikipedia and Tagalog Wikipedia (which as of  have  and  articles respectively).

Cebuano is the second most spoken language in the Philippines with about 20 million speakers. The Cebuano-language Wikipedia community claimed to be the only online encyclopedia in this language.

However, Cebuano Wikipedia does not appear to be widely used in the Philippines;  90 percent of Wikipedia views from that country were directed at English Wikipedia, with 5 percent going to Tagalog and 3 percent to Russian Wikipedia. About 30 percent of Cebuano Wikipedia views come from China, 22 percent from the United States, and only 11 percent from the Philippines (roughly, the same number as from France).

History and growth of articles
The Cebuano-language Wikipedia was launched in June 2005. In January 2006, 1,000 articles were created, while in November 2006 there were 1,400 articles. At the end of 2006 and 2007, the bots created some ten thousand articles on municipalities in France.

By the end of 2012, the number of articles increased to about 30,000. In December 2012, Lsjbot began to create articles. As a result, the number of articles increased dramatically in 2013, and from February to December 2013, the number of articles increased ninefold. By the end of 2015, about 99 percent of the then 1.4 million articles had been created by bots, including about 25,000 articles about localities and the rest of articles about living beings by Lsjbot.

On 16 July 2014, the Cebuano-language Wikipedia comprised one million articles, making it the twelfth-largest Wikipedia. After overtaking Spanish-, Italian-, Russian-, French-, Dutch- and German-speaking Wikipedia within a year and a half, in February 2016 it reached the two-million mark. After about half a year, followed by the third million, another half a year later, the fourth million. In August 2017, the five millionth article was created, making it the  largest Wikipedia.

An analysis of Cebuano Wikipedia content on Wikidata in July 2015 showed that of the then 1.21 million articles, 95.8 percent are living beings and biological species (1,160,787) and 3.3 percent are cities and communities (39,420).

References

External links 

 Cebuano Wikipedia
 Cebuano Wikipedia mobile

Internet properties established in 2005
Wikipedias by language
Philippine encyclopedias